June D'Rozario (born 16 June 1949) is an Australian urban planner and former politician.

|}

She was born in Lucknow, India and is of Anglo-Indian descent. D'Rozario studied planning at the University of South Australia, before joining the State Planning Office. After Cyclone Tracy in 1974, she moved to Darwin, Northern Territory to assist with the reconstruction effort.

In 1977, she was elected as a Labor member of the Northern Territory Legislative Assembly, unexpectedly defeating Executive Member for Law Liz Andrew in the seat of Sanderson. She held the seat until her defeat by Daryl Manzie at the 1983 election.

D'Rozario currently runs a Town & Regional Planning practice in Darwin, Northern Territory. She has been an urban planner in Darwin since 1973. She is a Fellow, and a National Councillor, of the Planning Institute of Australia (PIA). In 2001 she was awarded a Centenary Medal for services to urban planning and city development.

She is a member of the Board of Management of Uluṟu-Kata Tjuṯa National Park, a Commissioner of the Australian Heritage Commission, a member of the National Population Council, and a member of the Board of the Australia-India Council.

References

1949 births
Living people
Australian people of Anglo-Indian descent
Politicians of Indian descent
Members of the Northern Territory Legislative Assembly
Australian Labor Party members of the Northern Territory Legislative Assembly
Politicians from Lucknow
People from Darwin, Northern Territory
Indian emigrants to Australia
Women members of the Northern Territory Legislative Assembly
Indian expatriates in Australia